3:47 EST is the debut album by the Canadian progressive rock group Klaatu, released in August 1976. The album was renamed Klaatu when released in the United States by Capitol Records. The album is notable for its Beatlesque psychedelia. The Juno-nominated album cover was painted by a friend of Klaatu's members, a Canadian graphic artist, Ted Jones.

Rumours spread in the wake of the album's release that Klaatu were, in fact, a secretly reunited Beatles. The album was moderately successful in the United States, largely as a result of the Beatles rumours. Capitol Records seized the opportunity by giving elusive answers to press inquiries regarding the rumour, which further fueled media attention and publicity.

A remastered version of the album was released on Klaatu's indie record label "Klaatunes" in 2011. To accompany this release, a music video was made for the remastered version of "Calling Occupants".

Origin of the title
In the 1951 science fiction film The Day the Earth Stood Still, the alien emissary Klaatu arrives in Washington, D.C. at 3:47 in the afternoon Eastern Standard Time. According to a 1981 issue of the group's newsletter, "one of the band's member[s] viewed a screening ... and was immediately impressed by the appropriateness of the character Klaatu's arrival time on earth as the title of the band Klaatu's debut record album".

Musical style
AllMusics Dave Sleger said "Klaatu frequently alternated between Beatlesque pop, the showy guitar rock and vocal theatrics of early Queen, and the electronic orchestral techniques pioneered by Wendy Carlos, or worked all three into the structure of a four- or five-minute song".
Peter Kutz observed surf music, ‘70s progressive rock, and children’s novelty song on the album. Pitchfork described the album as “a wonderfully weird cross-section of Beatles-esque psych pop and '70s prog”.

Goldmine called the album a collection of “well-produced pop-rock songs”, and noted similarities to the Beach Boys, Pink Floyd, Moody Blues, King Crimson, and the Beatles. MusicHound, in its guide to rock music, observed baroque pop arrangements.

Track listing

The album ends with a mouse squeak. Their following album, Hope, begins with a mouse squeak. CDs that feature both albums on one disc omit one of these squeaks.

Personnel
The first pressing, and most reissues of this album, do not list the names of the band members.
Klaatu
 John Woloschuk - vocals, piano, organ, mellotron, acoustic guitar, bass guitar, synthesizers, percussion 
 Dee Long - vocals, acoustic guitar, electric guitar, electric sitar, synthesizers, ukulele, mellotron
 Terry Draper - drums, percussion, tympani, vocals

Additional musicians
Doug Riley - strings, woodwind, and xylophone on "Sir Bodsworth Rugglesby III"
Vern Dorge - chimes on "Sub Rosa Subway"
Bruce Cassidy - trumpet on "Doctor Marvello"
Dave Kennedy - guitars on "California Jam"
Raymond Gassi - backing vocals on "California Jam" 

Production
 Produced by Terry Brown & Klaatu
 Recorded & engineered by Steve Vaughn & Terry Brown
 Tape operators: Brian Bell & Paul Barker

References

External links
 "3:47 EST" at discogs

Klaatu (band) albums
1976 debut albums
Capitol Records albums
Albums produced by Terry Brown (record producer)